Matthiola maderensis is a flowering plant species of the family Brassicaceae. It is endemic to the Madeira Archipelago.

Description
It is a biennial or perennial herb, up to 90 cm height, with 5–25 cm long, lanceolate leaves. The flowers are violet, purple or rarely white, and stand in terminal racemes. The flowers are very fragrant.

References

maderensis
Flora of Madeira
Endemic flora of Madeira
Endemic flora of Macaronesia